Anisotome is a genus of flowering plants in the family Apiaceae. It has 16 species and is  found in Australia and New Zealand.

References

Apioideae
Taxa named by Joseph Dalton Hooker
Apioideae genera